Elizabeth Wright (born 1964, London) is an English sculptor and installation artist.

Work
Wright exhibited at the 1995 Venice Biennale.

Two of her works, a sculpture of a bicycle called B.S.A. Tour of Britain Racer Enlarged to 135% (1996/7) and a print entitled Snowball (2000) are in the collection of the Tate Gallery.

Notable exhibitions
 Karsten Schubert, London, 1995 - Wright presented a mixture of domestic and work environments, modelling the objects in unusual sizes, described as "a celebration of the versatility of human cognitive abilities." 
 Delfina, London, 1999 - the artist recreated the impression of rubber-tread skidmarks on the gallery floor in a site-specific installation called C579DJD, J839TVC, A896TLP

Further reading 
 Stonard, John-Paul. "Wright, Elizabeth." In Grove Art Online. Oxford Art Online, (accessed February 19, 2012; subscription required).

References

External links 
 Entry for Elizabeth Wright (artist) on the Union List of Artist Names

English installation artists
English women sculptors
1964 births
Artists from London
Living people
English contemporary artists
21st-century British women artists
20th-century English women
20th-century English people
21st-century English women
21st-century English people